Columbia is an unincorporated community in Marion County, Iowa, United States.

Unincorporated communities in Marion County, Iowa
Unincorporated communities in Iowa